Fire and Water may refer to:

Fire and Water (sculpture), a 1988 artwork in Milwaukee, Wisconsin

Film and TV
Fire and Water (Lexx), a location in the TV series Lexx
"Fire + Water" (Lost), a 2006 episode of the television series Lost
"Fire and Water" (Stargate SG-1), an episode of the television series Stargate SG-1

Music
"Fire and Water", 1971 hit single by Wilson Pickett
Fire and Water (Free album), a 1970 album by Free
"Fire and Water", title track on the album
 Fire & Water (Ecoutez Vos Murs), a 1983 album by Dave Greenfield and Jean-Jacques Burnel
"Fire and Water", a song by XYZ on the 1991 album Hungry

See also 
Firewater (disambiguation)